The Goldbergs is a 1950 American comedy film directed by Walter Hart and written by Gertrude Berg and N. Richard Nash. It is based on Berg's radio and television dramedy of the same name, which ran from 1929 to 1956. The film stars Gertrude Berg, Philip Loeb, Eli Mintz, Eduard Franz, Larry Robinson and Arlene McQuade. The film was released on December 23, 1950, by Paramount Pictures.

Plot

Molly and the family welcome an old beau of hers to town, and find he has brought with him his much-younger fiancé, whom Molly brings along to her evening music-appreciation classes. While attending them, the young bride-to-be and the teacher begin to exhibit a strong attraction to one another, leaving Molly to find ways to subtly intervene.

Cast       
Gertrude Berg as Molly Goldberg
Philip Loeb as Jake Goldberg
Eli Mintz as Uncle David
Eduard Franz as Alexander 'Abie' Abel
Larry Robinson as Sammy Goldberg
Arlene McQuade as Rosalie Goldberg
Betty Walker as Mrs. Bertha Kramer
Sarah Krohner as Tante Elka
David Opatoshu as Mr. Dutton
Barbara Rush as Debby Sherman
Peter Hansen as Ted Gordon
Helen Brown as Mrs. Morris
Edit Angold as Mrs. Schiller
Josephine Whittell as Mrs. Van Nest
Shari Robinson as Nomi
Ernő Verebes as Mr. Mendell

References

External links
 

1950 films
American comedy films
1950 comedy films
Films based on radio series
Films based on television series
Paramount Pictures films
American black-and-white films
1950s English-language films
1950s American films